is a 2020 erotic drama written and directed by Haruhiko Arai, based on the novel by Kazufumi Shiraishi. It was named Best Film of 2019 in the 2020 Kinema Junpo Awards

Plot
Kenji (Tasuku Emoto) receives a call from his father asking him to come home to Akita for the wedding of Naoki (Kumi Takiuchi), an old friend he has not seen in many years. Upon their reunion, it is revealed they once were lovers and quickly fall into an affair, which they agree will last only until Naoki's husband-to-be, a military man away on business, returns home for the wedding. Over the course of five days they reconnect, have a lot of sex, talk about their past together, other relationships, and the after-effects the Fukushima Daiichi nuclear disaster on their lives. The film is primarily a two-hander, with the only other characters appearing incidentally or offscreen.

Reception

Critical response
James Hadfield of The Japan Times praised the actors' "convincing chemistry" and found the film managed to be "explicit without being gratuitous" with "a welcome frankness in the film’s depictions of sex," noting "a common theme of people surrendering to private passion in the face of more momentous events beyond their control" with Arai's previous work. James Marsh of the South China Morning Post was less kind, calling the film "an interminable bore" and stating "Nothing remotely arousing is created during the numerous sex scenes, which are interspersed with dollops of pseudointellectual gibberish."

Awards and nominations

References 

2020 films
Japanese drama films
2020s erotic drama films